Gibbs & Cox is an American naval architecture firm that specializes in designing surface warships. Founded in 1922 in New York City, Gibbs & Cox is now headquartered in Arlington, Virginia.

The firm has offices in New York City; Washington, D.C.; Newport News, Virginia; Philadelphia, Pennsylvania; and New Orleans, LA.

In 2003, more than 150 warships built to the firm's designs, including 60 percent of the U.S. Navy's surface combatant fleet, were on active duty in nearly 20 navies.

History
The firm was founded as "Gibbs Brothers" by self-taught naval architect William Francis Gibbs and his brother Frederic H. Gibbs. The name was changed when architect Daniel H. Cox of Cox & Stevens joined the firm in 1929.

In 1931, Gibbs & Cox designed the MV Savarona, a large luxury yacht.

According to company officials, more than 70 percent of U.S. tonnage launched during World War II was built to Gibbs & Cox designs. Ship types included destroyers, LST landing craft, minesweepers, tankers, cruisers, Liberty Ships, and a variety of conversions.

On May 7, 2021, Leidos completed acquisition of Gibbs & Cox for $380 million. Gibbs & Cox operates as a wholly-owned subsidiary and is combined with Leidos’ maritime systems division.

Ships designed
Among the ship classes designed by Gibbs & Cox are:
Arleigh Burke-class destroyer
Captain-class frigate
EC2-S-C1-class transport ("Liberty ships")
Freedom-class Littoral Combat Ship
Gleaves-class destroyer
Mahan-class destroyer
Oliver Hazard Perry-class frigate
Tacoma-class frigate
Wind-class icebreaker

Among the individual ships designed by Gibbs & Cox are:
SS America
SS Malolo
SS Santa Paula
SS Santa Rosa
SS United States

Model shop

From 1939 until 1962, the firm operated a model shop that produced high-quality ship models that are considered among "the very finest examples of the steel ship modeler's art ever to be seen." This model, which is over 16 feet long, shows the complete inner structure on the starboard, and the exterior on the port.

This 1/48-scale ship required 77,000 man-hours to construct, and is as of September 2012 on display at the Navy Museum, Washington Navy Yard, Washington, DC.

Contracts
 CG(X): "Awarded a Naval Sea Systems Command multi-year contract for program management support, technical management support, ship design support and engineering" in partnership with Alion Science and Technology
 FFG(X): On 30 April 2020, it was announced that Fincantieri Marinette Marine's FREMM multipurpose frigate had won the contest and was awarded a $795 million contract for detailed design and construction of the lead ship, with options for nine additional ships.
 DDG(X): Design and engineering support contract awarded in 2022.

References

External links
Gibbs & Cox Official site

Design companies disestablished in 1922
Engineering companies of the United States
1922 establishments in New York (state)
American companies established in 1922
American naval architects
Companies based in Arlington County, Virginia
2021 mergers and acquisitions
American corporate subsidiaries